A G-line in Internet Relay Chat refers to a global network ban applied to a user.

G-line may also refer to:
 G (New York City Subway service)
 G Line (Los Angeles Metro), a bus rapid transit line in Los Angeles County, California
 G (Los Angeles Railway), former streetcar service
 G Line (RTD), commuter rail line serving Denver, Colorado
 A Global network ban 
 Goubau line, a single-wire transmission line or waveguide
 The peak at 435.8 nm on the emission spectrum of mercury. See .